Jan Thomas (born September 18, 1958) is an American writer and illustrator of children's books.  She lives in Socorro, New Mexico and has published three books with Harcourt Trade Publishers: What Will Fat Cat Sit On?, A Birthday for Cow, and The Doghouse; and three with Simon & Schuster's new children's imprint, Beach Lane Books, Can You Make a Scary Face?, Rhyming Dust Bunnies,  Here Comes the Big Mean Dust Bunny!, and in September 2011, Is Everyone Ready for Fun?.

Thomas illustrated the 2010 picture book, Let's Count Goats!, written by Mem Fox.

References

External links

 
 Rhyming Dust Bunnies at Facebook
 

1958 births
Living people
American children's writers
American women illustrators
American illustrators
Place of birth missing (living people)
People from Socorro, New Mexico
21st-century American women